The Wyandot people (also Wyandotte, Wendat, Waⁿdát, or Huron) are Indigenous peoples of the Northeastern Woodlands of North America, and speakers of an Iroquoian language. In the US the Wyandotte Nation is a federally recognized tribe headquartered in Wyandotte, Oklahoma. In Canada, the Wyandot sister nation is known as Huron-Wendat Nation, and they have two First Nations reserves at Wendake, Quebec.

The Wyandot emerged as a confederacy of tribes around the north shore of Lake Ontario, with their original homeland extending to Georgian Bay of Lake Huron and Lake Simcoe in Ontario, Canada and occupying territory around the western part of the lake. They predominantly descend from the ancient Tionontati (or Tobacco/Petun) people, who never belonged to the Huron (Wendat) Confederacy. However, the Wyandot(te) have connections to the Wendat-Huron through their lineage from the Attignawantan, the founding tribe of the Huron. The four Wyandot(te) Nations are descended from remnants of the Tionontati, Attignawantan and Wenrohronon (Wenro), that were "all unique independent tribes, who united in 1649–50 after being defeated by the Iroquois Confederacy."<ref> At the Bottom of Lake Huron, an Ancient Mystery Materializes], Scientific American, June 1, 2021 – see Lake Huron</ref>

After their defeat during prolonged warfare with the Five Nations of the Iroquois in 1649, the surviving members of the confederacy dispersed, some took residence at Quebec with the Jesuits and others were adopted by neighboring nations, such as the Tionontati or Tobacco to become the Wyandot. Later they occupied territory extending into what is now the United States, especially Michigan, northern Ohio, Kansas and finally northeastern Oklahoma due to U.S. federal removal policies. They are related to other Iroquoian peoples in the region, such as their powerful competitors, the Five Nations of the Iroquois who occupied territory mostly on the south side of Lake Ontario but had hunting grounds along the St. Lawrence River. They are also related to the neighboring Erie, Neutral Nation, Wenro, Susquehannock and Tionontate - all traditional enemies of the Iroquois and who at various points in history have also engaged in warfare and trade with one another.

 Etymology: Wandat—plus Erie, Huron 
In the early 17th century, this Iroquoian people called themselves the Wendat, an autonym which means "Dwellers of the Peninsula" or "Islanders". The Wendat historic territory was bordered on three sides by the waters of Georgian Bay and Lake Simcoe. According to tradition, French sailors thought that the bristly hairstyle of Wendat warriors resembled that of a boar. French fur traders and explorers referred to them as the "" (good Iroquois).

An alternate etymology from Russell Errett in 1885 is that the name is from the Iroquoian term  ("Cat Nation"), a name also applied to the Erie nation. The French pronounced the name as Hirri-ronon, and it gradually became known as Hirr-on, and finally spelled in its present form, Huron. William Martin Beauchamp concurred in 1907 that Huron was at least related to the Iroquoian root  ("nation").

In the late 17th century, elements of the Huron Confederacy and the Petun joined and became known as the Wyandot, a variation of Wendat.

History
Origin, and organization: before 1650
Early theories placed the Huron's origin in the St. Lawrence Valley. Some historians or anthropologists proposed the people were located near the present-day site of Montreal and former sites of the historic St. Lawrence Iroquoian peoples. Wendat is an Iroquoian language. Early 21st-century research in linguistics and archaeology confirm a historical connection between the Huron and the St. Lawrence Iroquois. But all of the Iroquoian-speaking peoples shared some aspects of their culture, including the Erie people, any or all of the later Six Nations of the Iroquois, and the Susquehannock.

By the 15th century, the pre-contact Wyandot occupied the large area from the north shores of most of the present-day Lake Ontario, northward up to the southeastern shores of Georgian Bay. From this homeland, they encountered the French explorer Samuel de Champlain in 1615. They historically spoke the Wyandot language, a Northern Iroquoian language. They were believed to number more than 30,000 at the time of European contact in the 1610s to 1620s.

In 1975 and 1978, archaeologists excavated a large 15th-century Huron village, now called the Draper Site, in Pickering, Ontario near Lake Ontario. It has been renamed as the Jean-Baptiste Lainé Site, in honor of a decorated Wendat-Huron soldier of World War II. 

Each of the sites had been surrounded by a defensive wooden palisade, as was typical of Iroquoian cultures. A total of four Wendat ancestral village sites have been excavated in Whitchurch-Stouffville. The large Mantle Site had more than 70 multi-family longhouses. Based on radiocarbon dating, it has been determined to have been occupied from 1587 to 1623. Its population was estimated at 1500–2000 persons.

Canadian archaeologist James F. Pendergast  states:

The Wendat were not a tribe but a confederacy of four or more tribes who had mutually intelligible languages. According to tradition, this Wendat (or Huron) Confederacy was initiated by the Attignawantan ("People of the Bear") and the Attigneenongnahac ("People of the Cord"), who made their alliance in the 15th century. They were joined by the Arendarhonon ("People of the Rock") about 1590, and the Tahontaenrat ("People of the Deer") around 1610. A fifth group, the Ataronchronon ("People of the Marshes or Bog"), may not have attained full membership in the confederacy, and may have been a division of the Attignawantan.

The largest Wendat settlement and capital of the confederacy, at least during the time of Jean de Brébeuf and the Jesuits was located at Ossossane. When Gabriel Sagard was among them however, Quienonascaran was the principal village of the Attignawantan, when Samuel de Champlain and Father Joseph Le Caron were among the Hurons in 1615, a village called Carhagouha may have been the capital. Modern-day Elmvale, Ontario developed near that site. The Wendat called their traditional territory Wendake.

Closely related to the people of the Huron Confederacy were the Tionontate, an Iroquoian-speaking group whom the French called the Petun (Tobacco), for their cultivation of that crop. They lived further south and were divided into two moitiés or groups: the Deer and the Wolves. Considering that they formed the nucleus of the tribe later known as the Wyandot, they too may have called themselves Wendat.

There was ongoing hostilities between the Iroquoian Wyandot and the Haudenosaunee, another Iroquoian confederacy, but the Wyandot had good relations with the Algonquian.

Tuberculosis (TB) was endemic among the Huron, aggravated by their close and smoky living conditions in the longhouses. Despite this, the Huron on the whole were healthy. The Jesuits wrote that the Huron effectively employed natural remedies and were "more healthy than we".

European contact and Wyandot dispersal

The earliest written accounts of the Huron were made by the French, who began exploring North America in the 16th century. News of the Europeans reached the Huron, particularly when Samuel de Champlain explored the Saint Lawrence River in the early 17th century. Some Huron decided to go and meet the Europeans. Atironta, the principal headman of the Arendarhonon tribe, went to Quebec and allied with the French in 1609.

The Jesuit Relations of 1639 describes the Huron:

The total population of the Huron at the time of European contact has been estimated at 20,000 to 40,000 people. From 1634 to 1640, the Huron were devastated by Eurasian infectious diseases, such as measles and smallpox, which were endemic among the Europeans. The peoples of North America had no acquired immunity to these diseases and suffered very high mortality rates. Epidemiological studies have shown that beginning in 1634, more European children emigrated with their families to the New World from cities in France, Britain, and the Netherlands, which had endemic smallpox. Historians believe the disease spread from the children to the Huron and other nations, often through contact with traders.

So many Huron died that they abandoned many of their villages and agricultural areas. About half to two-thirds of the population died in the epidemics, decreasing the population to about 12,000. Such losses had a high social cost, devastating families and clans, and disrupting their society's structure and traditions.

Before the French arrived, the Huron had already been in conflict with the Haudenosaunee Confederacy (Five Nations) to the south. Once the European powers became involved in trading, the conflict among natives intensified significantly as they struggled to control the lucrative fur trade and satisfy European demand. The French allied with the Huron because they were the most advanced trading nation at the time. The Haudenosaunee tended to ally with the Dutch and later English, who settled at Albany and in the Mohawk Valley of their New York territory.

The introduction of European weapons and the fur trade increased competition and the severity of inter-tribal warfare. While the Haudenosaunee could easily obtain guns in exchange for furs from Dutch traders in New York, the Wendat were required to profess Christianity to obtain a gun from French traders in Canada. Therefore, they were unprepared, on March 16, 1649, when a Haudenosaunee war party of about 1,000 entered Wendake and burned the Huron mission villages of St. Ignace and St. Louis in present-day Simcoe County, Ontario, killing about 300 people. The Iroquois also killed many of the Jesuit missionaries, who have since been honored as North American Martyrs. The surviving Jesuits burned the mission after abandoning it to prevent its capture. The extensive Iroquois attack shocked and frightened the surviving Huron. The Huron were geographically cut off from trade with the Dutch and British by the Iroquois Confederacy, who had access to free trade with all the Europeans in the area especially the Dutch. This forced them to continue to use lithic tools and weapons like clubs, bows and arrows, stone scrapers, and cutters. This is compared to the near-universal use of European iron tools by Iroquois groups in the area. Huron trade routes were consistently pillaged by raiders, and the lack of firearms discouraged the Hurons' trade with the French, at least without French protection. As a result of their lack of exposure, the Huron did not have as much experience using firearms compared to their neighbors, putting them at a significant disadvantage when firearms were available to them, and when available, their possession of firearms made them a larger target for Iroquois aggression.

After 1634 their numbers were drastically reduced by epidemics of new infectious diseases carried by Europeans, among whom these were endemic. The weakened Wyandotte were dispersed by the war in 1649 waged by the Iroquois Confederacy of Five Nations, or Haudenosaunee, then based largely south of the Great Lakes in New York and Pennsylvania. Archaeological evidence of this displacement has been uncovered at the Rock Island II Site in Wisconsin.

By May 1, 1649, the Huron had burned 15 of their villages to prevent their stores from being taken and fled as refugees to surrounding tribes. About 10,000 fled to Gahoendoe (now also called Christian Island). Most who fled to the island starved over the winter, as it was an unproductive settlement and could not provide for them. After spending the bitter winter of 1649–50 on the island, surviving Huron relocated near Quebec City, where they settled at Wendake. Absorbing other refugees, they became the Huron-Wendat Nation. Some Huron, along with the surviving Petun, whose villages the Iroquois attacked in the fall of 1649, fled to the upper Lake Michigan region, settling first at Green Bay, then at Michilimackinac.

In the late 17th century, the Huron (Wyandot) Confederacy merged with the Iroquoian-speaking Tionontati nation (known as the Petun in French, also known as the Tobacco people for their chief commodity crop). They may originally have been a splinter colony of the Huron, to their west to form the historical Wyandot.

The Huron Range spanned the region from downriver of the source of the St. Lawrence River, along with three-quarters of the northern shore of Lake Ontario, to the territory of the related Neutral people, extending north from both ends to wrap around Georgian Bay. This became their territorial center after their 1649 defeat and dispossession.

Huron–British Treaty of 1760
On September 5, 1760, just prior to the capitulation of Montreal to British forces, Brigadier-General James Murray signed a "Treaty of Peace and Friendship" with a Wyandot chief then residing in the settlement of Lorette. The text of the treaty reads as follows:

The treaty recognized the Wyandot as a distinct nation and guaranteed that the British would not interfere with the tribe's internal affairs. In 1990, the Supreme Court of Canada, ruling in R v Sioui, found that the Huron-British Treaty of 1760 was still valid and binding on the Canadian Crown. Accordingly, the exercise of Wyandot religion, customs, and trade benefit from continuing Canadian constitutional protection throughout the territory frequented by the tribe during the period the treaty was concluded.

Emergence of the Wyandot

In the late 17th century, elements of the Huron Confederacy and the Petun joined and became known as the Wyandot (or Wyandotte), a variation of Wendat. (This name is also related to the French transliteration of the Mohawk term for tobacco.) The western Wyandot re-formed in the area of Ohio and southern Michigan in the United States.

In August 1782, the Wyandot joined forces with Simon Girty, a British soldier. On August 15 through 19, 1782, they unsuccessfully besieged Bryan Station in Kentucky (near present-day Lexington). They drew the Kentucky militia to Lower Blue Licks, where the Wyandot defeated the militia led by Daniel Boone. The Wyandot gained the high ground and surrounded Boone's forces.

Also in late 1782, the Wyandot joined forces with Shawnee, Seneca, and Lenape in an unsuccessful siege of Fort Henry on the Ohio River.

During the Northwest Indian War, the Wyandot fought alongside British allies against the United States. Under the leadership of Tarhe, they were signatories to the Treaty of Greenville in 1795.

In 1807, the Wyandot joined three other tribes – the Odawa, Potawatomi, and Ojibwe people – in signing the Treaty of Detroit, which resulted in a major land cession to the United States. This agreement between the tribes and the Michigan Territory (represented by William Hull) ceded to the United States a part of their territory in today's Southeastern Michigan and a section of Ohio near the Maumee River. The tribes were allowed to keep small pockets of land in the territory. The Treaty of Brownstown was signed by Governor Hull on November 7, 1807, and provided the Indigenous nations with a payment of $10,000 in goods and money along with an annual payment of $2,400 in exchange for an area of land that included the southeastern one-quarter of the lower peninsula of Michigan. In 1819, the Methodist Church established a mission to the Wyandot in Ohio, its first to Native Americans.

In the 1840s, most of the surviving Wyandot people were displaced to Kansas Indigenous territory through the US federal policy of forced Indian removal. Using the funds they received for their lands in Ohio, the Wyandot purchased  of land for $46,080 in what is now Wyandotte County, Kansas from the Delaware (Lenape). The Lenape had been grateful for the hospitality which the Wyandot had given them in Ohio, as the Lenape had been forced to move west under pressure from Anglo-European colonists. The Wyandot acquired a more-or-less square parcel north and west of the junction of the Kansas River and the Missouri River. A United States government treaty granted the Wyandot Nation a small portion of fertile land located in an acute angle of the Missouri River and Kansas River, which they purchased from the Delaware in 1843. Also, the government granted 32 "floating sections", located on public lands west of the Mississippi River.

In June 1853, Big Turtle, a Wyandot chief, wrote to the Ohio State Journal regarding the current condition of his tribe. The Wyandot had received nearly $127,000 for their lands in 1845. Big Turtle noted that, in the spring of 1850, the tribal chiefs retroceded the granted land to the government. They invested $100,000 of the proceeds in 5% government stock. After removal to Kansas, the Wyandot had founded good libraries along with two thriving Sabbath schools. They were in the process of organizing a division of the Sons of Temperance and maintained a sizable temperance society. Big Turtle commented on the agricultural yield, which produced an annual surplus for the market. He said that the thrift of the Wyandot exceeded that of any tribe north of the Arkansas line. According to his account, the Wyandot nation was "contented and happy", and enjoyed better living conditions in the Indigenous territory than they had in Ohio.

By 1855 the number of Wyandot had diminished to 600 or 700 people. On August 14 of that year, the Wyandot Nation elected a chief. The Kansas correspondent of the Missouri Republican reported that the judges of the election were three elders who were trusted by their peers. The Wyandot offered some of the floating sections of land for sale on the same day at $800. Altogether  were sold for $25,600. They were located in Kansas, Nebraska, and unspecified sites. Surveys were not required, with the title becoming complete at the time of location.

The Wyandot played an important role in Kansas politics. On July 26, 1853, at a meeting at the Wyandot Council house in Kansas City, William Walker (Wyandot) was elected provisional governor of Nebraska Territory, which included Kansas. He was elected by Wyandot, white traders, and outside interests who wished to preempt the federal government's organization of the territory and to benefit from the settlement of Kansas by white settlers. Walker and others promoted Kansas as the route for the proposed transcontinental railroad. Although the federal government did not recognize Walker's election, the political activity prompted the federal government to pass the Kansas–Nebraska Act to organize Kansas and Nebraska territories.

An October 1855 article in The New York Times reported that the Wyandot were free (that is, they had been accepted as US citizens) and without the restrictions placed on other tribes. Their leaders were unanimously pro-slavery, which meant 900 or 1,000 additional votes in opposition to the Free State movement of Kansas.
In 1867, after the American Civil War, additional members were removed from the Midwest to Indian Territory. Today more than 4,000 Wyandot can be found in eastern Kansas and northeastern Oklahoma.

The last known original Wyandot of Ohio was Margaret "Grey Eyes" Solomon, known as "Mother Solomon". The daughter of Chief John Grey Eyes, she was born in 1816 and left Ohio in 1843. By 1889 she had returned to Ohio, when she was recorded as a spectator to the restoration of the Wyandot's Old Mission Church at Upper Sandusky. She died in Upper Sandusky on August 17, 1890. 

20th century to present

Archeological work in Canada and the United States has revealed the Wyandot's ancestral roots in what are now Canada and the United States. It also has provided evidence about the peoples' migrations and interactions with other Indigenous groups, as well as the French and British colonists. Beginning in 1907, archaeological excavations were conducted at the Jesuit mission site near Georgian Bay. The mission has since been reconstructed as Sainte-Marie among the Hurons, a living museum to interpret Wyandot and Jesuit history; it is adjacent to the Martyrs' Shrine. This Roman Catholic shrine is consecrated to the ten North American martyrs.

Since the mid-century, the Wyandot pursued claims in the United States because of having lost lands and not been fully compensated by the government. The US federal government set up the Indian Claims Court in the 1940s to address grievances filed by various Native American tribes. The court adjudicated claims, and Congress allocated $800 million to compensate tribes for losses due to treaties broken by the US government, or losses of land due to settlers who invaded their territories. The Wyandot filed a land claim for compensation due to the forced sale of their land in the Ohio region to the federal government under the 1830 Indian Removal Act, which forced Native Americans to move west of the Mississippi River to an area designated as Indian Territory. Originally the United States paid the Wyandot for their land at the rate of 75 cents per acre, but the land was worth $1.50 an acre.

Although Congress intended to have a deadline by which Indigenous claims had to be settled, Federal district courts continued to hear land claims and other cases for compensation. In February 1985, the US government finally agreed to pay descendants of the Wyandot $5.5 million to settle the tribe's outstanding claim. The decision settled claims related to the 143-year-old treaty. In 1842 the United States had forced the tribe to sell their Ohio lands for less-than-fair value. A spokesman for the Bureau of Indian Affairs said that the government would pay $1,600 each, in July 1985, to 3,600 people in Kansas and Oklahoma who could prove they were descendants of Wyandot affected by Indian Removal.

During the 20th century, contemporary Wyandot continued to assert their culture and identity. On August 27, 1999, representatives of the far-flung Wyandot bands from Quebec, Kansas, Oklahoma and Michigan gathered at their historic homeland in Midland, Ontario. There they formally re-established the Wendat Confederacy.

There are also unrecognized tribes in Kansas and Michigan who identify as Wyandot descendants.

Contemporary Wyandot groups

Recognized Wyandot nations
In the United States, there is one federally recognized tribe:
 The Wyandotte Nation is headquartered in Wyandotte, Oklahoma, and in 2023 had 6,883 enrolled members.

In Canada, there is one Wyandot First Nation:
 The Huron-Wendat Nation is based on two reserves in Wendake, now within the Quebec City limits, and it has approximately 4,410 members. They are primarily Catholic in religion and speak French as a first language. They have begun to promote the study and use of the Wyandot language among their children. For many decades, a leading source of income for the Wyandot of Quebec has been selling pottery, traditional-pattern snowshoes, summer and winter moccasins, and other locally produced crafts.

 Unrecognized groups  
Two unrecognized tribes in the United States identify as Wyandot:
 Wyandot Nation of Anderdon, with headquarters in Trenton, Michigan, they state on their website that they have 1,200 members
 Wyandot Nation of Kansas, headquartered in Kansas City, Kansas

The unrecognized Wyandot Nation of Kansas has had legal battles with the federally-recognized Wyandotte Nation over the fate of the Huron Cemetery in Kansas City, Kansas. Listed on the National Register of Historic Places because of its significance, the property has been contended by these groups for more than a century. Because of complications during the Indian removal process, the land was under the legal control of the federally-recognized Wyandotte Nation of Oklahoma, made up of people who had left Kansas and their descendants. Contemporary representatives expressed interest in redeveloping the land occupied by the historic cemetery, to provide revenue to benefit the federally recognized tribe. Members of the local Kansas Wyandot, many of whom have family members buried at the historic cemetery, have strongly opposed most such proposals. The redevelopment would require reinterment of Wyandot and other Indian remains, including many of their direct ancestors. In 1998, the two groups finally agreed to preserve the cemetery in Kansas City for religious, cultural, and other uses appropriate to its sacred history and use.

Culture
Like other Iroquoian peoples, the Huron were historically sedentary farmers who supplemented their diet with hunting and fishing. The women traditionally cultivated several varieties of maize, squash, and beans (the "Three Sisters") as the mainstay of their diet, saving seeds of various types, and working to produce the best crops for different purposes. They also collected nuts, fruit, and wild root vegetables. Their preparation of this produce was supplemented primarily by fish caught by the men. The men also hunted deer and other animals available during the game seasons. Women have traditionally done most of the crop planting, cultivation, and processing, although men have helped with the heaviest work of clearing the fields or fortifying the village with palisades. Wood has traditionally been gathered and brush cleared by the  slash-and-burn method. Each family owned a plot of land which they farmed; this land reverted to the common property of the tribe when the family no longer used it.

Historically, the Huron have lived in villages spanning from one to ten acres (40,000 m2), most of which were strongly fortified and enclosed by high and strong palisades of wood in double and sometimes triple rows for defense against enemy attack. They have also lived in longhouses covered with tree bark similar to other Iroquoian cultural groups, which could house twenty or more families in one dwelling, and were in different lengths, some being thirty or forty feet in length. A typical village or town had 900 to 1,600 people organized into 30 or 40 longhouses. Villages were moved about every ten years as the soil became less fertile and the nearby forest – from which they took firewood – grew thin. The Huron engaged in trade with neighboring tribes, notably for tobacco with the neighboring Petun and Neutral nations.

The Huron way of life is very gender-specific in practice. Men set off for war or hunted for game to feed their people. Women made the clothes, cooked and processed game, farmed, and raised the children.

Like other Iroquoian peoples, the Wyandot have historically followed a matrilineal kinship system, with children considered born to the mother's lineage, their status traditionally inherited from hers. In this way her older brother would be more important to her sons than their biological father.

As children grow older, they slowly grow into their roles within their society. Both genders learn from adults how to do certain things that later will help the tribe. For example, as children, girls learn how to make doll clothing, which teaches them the skills needed to make garments for people. Boys are given miniature bows so they may practice hunting very small game. All young children are integrated into society, and given small tasks and responsibilities based on their age. Boys accompany men on some hunting events to learn firsthand how to hunt, receive tips on what to do while hunting, and develop needed skills for when they are older. Girls learn the same way, by follwing and watching the women conduct their daily routines, mimicking them on a smaller scale. 

War

Samuel de Champlain made mortal enemies with the Iroquois when he fought alongside a war party of Hurons and Algonquins who demanded that he assist them in their ongoing conflict against their hated enemy.

Souring a relationship between the French people that hadn't even started yet for nearly one hundred years; however, he was also trying to make peace between the two tribes (Huron and Iroquois).

See also
 Kondiaronk

 Explanatory footnotes 

 Wendlas The Wyandot people or Wendat, also called the Hu-ron(on)= Nation and Hu-ron(on) Catti people

Citations

 General references 
 
 
 
 
 
 Labelle, Kathryn Magee (2013). D dispersed but Not Destroyed: A History of the Seventeenth-Century Wendat People. UBC Press. 
 
 
 
 

Further reading

 
 
 
 

External links

Official tribal websites
 Wyandotte Nation of Oklahoma
 Huron-Wendat Nation, Wendake, Quebec

Unrecognized groups
 Wyandot Nation of Kansas
 Wyandot of Anderdon Nation, Michigan

Other
 Sagard's Dictionary of Huron – The earliest and one of the most complete dictionaries of the Huron language
 The Huron-Wendat Museum, Wendake, Quebec
 
 "The Feast of the Dead", Erik R. Seeman, Berfrois'', August 2, 2011
 History of the Huron

 
 
Great Lakes tribes
Indigenous peoples of the Northeastern Woodlands
First Nations in Ontario
First Nations in Quebec
Native American tribes in Ohio
Native American tribes in Oklahoma
Native Americans in the American Revolution
Native American tribes in Michigan